Short Creek is a stream in the U.S. state of West Virginia. It is a tributary of the Ohio River.

Short Creek was so named on account of its relatively short watercourse.

See also
List of rivers of West Virginia

References

Rivers of Brooke County, West Virginia
Rivers of Marshall County, West Virginia
Rivers of Ohio County, West Virginia
Rivers of West Virginia